NAIRI: Tower of Shirin is a point-and-click adventure game and visual novel, developed by the Dutch indie game developer HomeBearStudio and published by Hound Picked Games. The game was released on November 29, 2018 for the Windows and Nintendo Switch platforms.

Gameplay
The player takes the role of the protagonist, Nairi. While the story of the game is primarily told in visual novel format, the player is required to navigate through various locations and solve puzzles and combine objects to advance. At certain points, the player can communicate with other characters and receive more background information about the world and plot. The player can find hidden coins in almost every scene; these coins can be used to unlock concept art of the game.

Plot
Nairi is a human girl living in the rich district of Shirin. When her tutor, a talking Raccoon, tells her that she has to leave the house and not return she flees and ends up in being smuggled out of the district. Later on, she investigates the lower districts of Shirin and the Tower that a friend, Rex, has been learning about. Soon, Nairi discovers a magical ancient world and that she has a bigger role than she anticipated.

Development
The game was financed by 278 backers through a Kickstarter campaign in October 2016. The goal of the campaign was to raise a total of 7,500 €; this goal was surpassed with a total of 8,253 €. The game was written, designed, and programmed by Josh van Kuilenburg, while the art, animation, and Japanese localization was done by You Miichi. Antonio Garcia was responsible for the dialogue content editing as well as the Spanish localization. Furthermore, the game was localized into German, French, Italian and Chinese. The art style was inspired by Studio Ghibli as well as Disney and Pixar.

Reception
The game received overall positive reviews, with reviewers praising the story, art, and challenging puzzles, but criticizing the confusing navigation, some bugs, and the lack of voice acting. 

A Kay Purcell from GAMING TREND gave a "Great" rating with 80 out of 100 points, saying, "Nairi: Tower of Shirin is a witty, cute, and quirky point-and-click adventure. Silly and slightly morbid, Nairi shines with unique characters, hand-drawn artwork, and challenging but fair puzzles. It is held back slightly by some confusing navigation, a few bugs, and the inability to save your progress, but this charming little gem is a must-play for fans of the genre."

John Friscia from Nintendo Enthusiast gave a rating of 7.5 out of 10 and said, "NAIRI: Tower of Shirin is a gorgeous and entertaining puzzle adventure with charming characters. It lasted me, a puzzle novice, 8-10 hours, but mileage will vary."

Ben Bayliss from DualShockers gave a rating of 7.5 out of 10, saying, "My time with Nairi: Tower of Shirin was both a real test of brain power with tough puzzles but also a charming retreat in which I lost myself within a story that captivated me. The art style keeps the title visually pleasing throughout, and the twists and turns kept it interesting. The controls feel fantastic on the Switch and it ideally should be your platform of choice for this title."

References

External links
 Official website

2018 video games
Fantasy video games
Video games developed in the Netherlands
Windows games
Nintendo Switch games
Visual novels